Charles Bird may refer to:

 Charlie Bird (born 1949), Irish journalist and broadcaster
 Charles Smith Bird (1795–1862), English academic, cleric and theological writer
 Charles Warren Bird (1919–2009), Canadian veteran